The South Yorkshire League was a football competition for clubs in the Dearne Valley area of South Yorkshire.

Honours

League champions

References

Defunct football leagues in England
Defunct football competitions in South Yorkshire
1892 establishments in England
Sports leagues established in 1892
1923 disestablishments in England
Sports leagues disestablished in 1923